The Planners is a British television documentary series broadcast on BBC Two. It follows the work of local planning officers in the United Kingdom, including planners in Cheshire, Greater Manchester, the Scottish Borders and Gloucestershire.

The series comprises eight episodes and was first broadcast on 31 January 2013.

On 25 February 2014, The Planners returned to BBC Two, however, the name of the programme was changed to Permission Impossible: Britain's Planners.

See also
Permission Impossible: Britain's Planners
The Planners Are Coming

References

External links

2013 British television series debuts
2013 British television series endings
BBC television documentaries
Town and country planning in the United Kingdom
English-language television shows
Television series by BBC Studios